Elizabeth Mall may refer to:

 Elizabeth Street Mall, a pedestrian street mall in Hobart, Tasmania
 Elizabeth Mall (Cebu City), a shopping mall located in Cebu City, Philippines